Fujian Medical University is a university located in Fuzhou, Fujian, China. Fujian Medical University was founded in 1937, named Fujian Provincial Medical Vocational School at that time. The name of the school was changed to Fujian Provincial Medical College in 1939 and was called Fujian Medical College in 1949. In 1969, after merging with Fujian Chinese Traditional Medical College and the medical department of Huaqiao University, Fujian Medical University was founded and moved to Quanzhou, Fujian. It was moved back to Fuzhou in 1978. The name of the school was changed back to Fujian Medical College in 1982 and then changed back to the present name in April 1996.

Campus
Fujian Medical University consist of two main campuses, covering over 876,710 square meters. Currently, the university consists of 17 colleges and departments, 22 undergraduate majors (aspects), 22 doctor-degree locations and 59 master-degree locations. It was conferred the right to recruit Taiwanese students by itself and the students from foreign countries, Hong Kong and Macau. There are more than 1600 postgraduates, 9300 undergraduates and 8700 vocational students. The school was affirmed as the key constructive university by the Fujian provincial government and passed through the teaching evaluation of undergraduate education with good achievements in 2003.

Departments/schools shown as below:
 School of Basic Medicine
 Department of Clinical Medicine*
 School of Public Health
 School of Dentistry
 School of Medical Technology and Engineering
 School of Pharmaceutics
 School of Medical Caring
 School of Literature
 School of Continue Education
 School of International Education
 Department of Physical Health
 School of Foreign Language
 Department of Political Theory and Educating
*Fujian Medical University's Clinical Department consists of ten affiliated hospitals, which provide FJMU's medical graduates with residency programs or intern programs.

Faculty

There are over 5304 staff members on post, among which there are over 736 teachers on campus. Among the professional teachers,56% possess the postgraduate degree and 55.2% are on the senior professional posts. There are 60PhD tutors, 469 tutors for master students, four national outstanding specialists,100 sharing the special subsidy of the state council, three outstanding specialists of Health Ministry and 16 provincial outstanding specialists.

The university has 8 affiliated hospitals, 24 teaching hospitals (including 2 clinical colleges) and more than 20 professional teaching bases. A flawless net of clinical teaching and practical teaching base has been formed.

The university library has collection of 1,430,000 volumes, and with the space of 25600 square meters.

The university has 1 research site of postdoctoral, 65 bases for drug clinical trial of the state, 13 provincial key courses, 8 preferable developer courses of provincial science and technology committee,6 school key courses, 6 provincial key medical specialties, 5 provincial top medicine-character specialties and 3 provincial key laboratories, which are undertaking huge scientific tasks with remarkable achievements. Since 2001, over 100 items achievements in scientific research have been giver kinds of award. More than 5,500 papers have been published, among which 86 ones are recorded in SCI.45 academic works have been issued as well.

The university has established the cooperative of scientific research and talents training with the universities and medical research institutes from the United States, Japan, Sweden, Denmark, Finland, Australia, Canada and so on. In 5 years, more than 160 groups/700 people from the United States, Japan, etc. Have visited the university, giving lectures and the carrying out other academic activities. More than 20 overseas alumni are engaged the posts in colleges, departments and research institutes, 110 experts and alumni are engaged as the guest professors. University also provides students to do their courses with scholarship for Recommended students per batch. It hosts international students from India, Pakistan, Bangladesh, Sri Lanka, Russia, and Germany. These students can access the library for free until they complete their course.

The university is keeping the developing way of over-normal order and striding across, in order to run the university as the moderated-running scale, reasonable running composition, high-running level and with actual strength. It will being emphasis on the education of normal subjects to speed the education of postgraduates and long-term system. It will be formed as a provincial key university focusing on medicine, developing science, management and law etc. In proportion. The university will turn into the main base of training high-level medical talents, the center of medical scientific research and medical treatment service of both side of the channel. It will reach the general level to the advanced one among the same kinds of universities.

References

External links
Fujian Medical University
real 3D map

Universities in China with English-medium medical schools
Universities and colleges in Fujian
Medical schools in China
Educational institutions established in 1937
1937 establishments in China